Francis Edward Dec (January 6, 1926January 21, 1996)  was an American lawyer and outsider writer who was best known for his typewritten diatribes that he independently mailed and published from the late 1960s onward. His works are characterized by highly accusatory and vulgar attacks, often making use of conglomerate phrases like "Mad Deadly Worldwide Communist Gangster Computer God" to slander people, groups, or companies that he believed were engaging in electronic harassment against him, and gained a cult following from the mid-1980s onward due to their comedic incoherence.

Biography 

Francis E. Dec was born in New York on January 6, 1926. In early 1944, during the Second World War, he enlisted into the United States Army with the rank of private. However, he remained within the United States for the duration of the war, albeit periodically moving between bases, at one point being assigned to Yuma Army Air Station. After the war, Dec entered into law, but was disbarred by the state of New York in 1958 and proceeded to make numerous "incoherent" legal appeals, including an appeal to the Supreme Court. He was admitted to a psychiatric hospital for 60 days in 1961 and in 1965 attempted to flee his home in Hempstead, New York for Poland. Dec spent the next 25 years writing and distributing lengthy screeds about the "Worldwide Communist Gangster Computer God" and its conspiracy to control the world through electronic mind control devices which he referred to as "Frankenstein Radio Controls." These flyers were mailed to radio and television stations across the United States. According to Dec, the Worldwide Communist Gangster Computer God was the product of an ancient Polish (Slavonic) civilization which it subsequently drove to near-extinction.

Analysis
Jeffrey Sconce analyzed the written works of Francis E. Dec in his book The Technical Delusion: Electronics, Power, Insanity, within a chapter discussing the phenomenon of targeted individuals. In it, he states that "his writing speaks to a feature of technical delusions that became increasingly prominent in the second half of the twentieth century." Sconce also identifies that "Dec's screeds are emblematic in their careening, amplified panic over imperious yet chimerical powers that seemingly are everywhere all the time and yet can never be fully confronted or understood."

Legacy
Dec gained a cult following in the 1980s, especially when specific fans of his attempted to contact him. In 1989, Dec went on a sojourn to New York, and fans attempting to contact him at his house were left facing his house in dismay: "The house is daubed red-on-blue, surrounded by wild hedges, and has a blue trash can with ornamental glass knob for a mailbox. Heavy blinds kept us from viewing any 'strange stuff' inside. It was I who asked the cabbies about Dec: 'Dat old German mon? He's in dere!' 'Is he, you know...' pointing to my head. 'Well, look at de house, mon!' End of adventure. Should've sent money."

Among other figures interested in Dec's works were William S. Burroughs and Genesis P-Orridge; the latter used a recording of Doc Britton voice reading Dec's rants on the Psychic TV album "Ultrahouse (The L.A. Connection)". A 1983 issue of the comics anthology Weirdo reprinted a page of Dec's writings, and a stage play inspired by Dec, titled A History of Heen (not Francis E. Dec Esq.) premiered in 1999.

See also
 Persecutory delusion
 Tartary
 , another theory claiming historical Polish world domination

References

External links
UbuWeb audio of Dec's collected works, performed by the KROQ-FM newscaster Boyd Britton (known as "Doc on the ROQ").
Fansite by online cartoonist zer0 which features transcriptions of Dec's works.

Disbarred American lawyers
American conspiracy theorists
American people of Polish descent
United States Army personnel of World War II
Pseudohistorians
20th-century American writers
1926 births
1996 deaths
United States Army soldiers
American anti-communists
Outsider artists